Decatur Central High School (DCHS) is a public high school in Indianapolis, Indiana, United States.

About
Decatur Central High School is part of the Metropolitan School District of Decatur Township. The school currently enrolls students from grades nine through twelve.

Small learning communities
Decatur Central has "small learning communities" with different learning styles. Students decide which SLC they would like to be entered in with a form explaining all the SLCs. This form is composed of a selection graph explaining the SLC they would like to be in, and a short essay area. In total there are five SLCs: Choice, Edge, Innovation, New Tech, and Q&I.

Demographics
Of Decatur Central's 1,632 students (in the 2007–08 school year), 83% were Caucasian, 10% were African American, 4% were Hispanic, 1% were Asian, and 2% were multiracial.  43% of students qualified for free lunches and 0% qualified for reduced price lunches.

Athletics
The mascot of Decatur Central is the Hawk; the school colors are Navy Blue and Varsity Gold.

Notable alumni
 Aaron Gibson - former NFL offensive tackle for the Chicago Bears, Dallas Cowboys and Detroit Lions
 Amy Cozad, Olympic diver in the 2016 Rio Olympics
Tommy Stevens - drafted by the New Orleans Saints in the seventh round with the 240th overall pick in the 2020 NFL Draft.

See also
 List of high schools in Indiana

References

External links
 

Schools in Indianapolis
Public high schools in Indiana